Jane Wiedlin is the debut studio album by American musician Jane Wiedlin, released in October 1985 by I.R.S. Records. It was her first solo album after leaving new wave group The Go-Go's. The track "My Traveling Heart" dealt with Wiedlin's feelings about the breakup of the band.

"Blue Kiss" was released as the lead single, reaching 77 on the Billboard Hot 100 and 30 on Hot Dance Club Play. The album itself reached 127 on the Billboard 200.

Critical reception

Stewart Mason, of AllMusic, stated: "Aside from the unfortunately slick mid-'80s production, Jane Wiedlin's 1985 solo debut is probably the best solo album by any ex-member of the Go-Go's. The singles 'Modern Romance' and 'Blue Kiss' really should have been hits (they're certainly better than most of Belinda Carlisle's solo work), and the best of the album tracks trade the pertness of the Go-Go's for a slightly more mature, world-weary vibe."

Track listing

References

External links
Official website

1985 debut albums
Jane Wiedlin albums
I.R.S. Records albums
Albums produced by Russ Kunkel
Albums produced by Bill Payne
Albums produced by George Massenburg